Gelora Delta Sidoarjo is a multi-purpose stadium in the regency of Sidoarjo, East Java, Indonesia. The stadium is located within Greater Surabaya metropolitan area. It is currently mostly used for football matches. The stadium has a capacity of 35,000 people. The stadium was built for organizing the PON XV (15th Indonesian National Sports Week) 2000, which was hosted by East Java and after the event East Java PON museum was built in front of the stadium.

The stadium is used as a venue for Indonesian National Football League. It is the home base of Deltras Sidoarjo, Persida Sidoarjo and PS Hizbul Wathan.

Sport events
 2000 Pekan Olahraga Nasional
 2006 Piala Indonesia Final.
 2007 Piala Indonesia Opening match.
 2007 Liga Indonesia Premier Division Quarterfinals.
 2013 AFF U-19 Youth Championship
 2014 Liga Indonesia Premier Division Semifinals and final.
 2018 AFF U-18 Youth Championship
 2018 AFF U-16 Youth Championship

International matches hosted

References

Sidoarjo Regency
Buildings and structures in East Java
Multi-purpose stadiums in Indonesia
Sports venues in Indonesia
Football venues in Indonesia
Athletics (track and field) venues in Indonesia
Football venues in East Java
Athletics (track and field) venues in East Java